Laxminarayan Pandey (28 March 1928 – 19 May 2016) was a member of the 5th, 6th, 9th, 10th, 11th, 12th, 13th, and 14th Lok Sabha of India. He represented the Mandsaur constituency of Madhya Pradesh and was a member of the Bharatiya Janata Party (BJP) political party.

Political career

Pandey has had many spells as an MP. The first was in 1971 and 1977 where he was elected on the Bharatiya Jana Sangh (BJS) and Bharatiya Lok Dal (BLD) ticket, respectively. Pandey was the first MP from Mandsaur for Jan Sangh and a very close aide of Atal Bihari Vajpayee and LK Advani.

Death 

He died at age of 88 in Indore, Madhya Pradesh after battling old-age related illnesses in a private hospital.

References

External links
 Fourteenth Lok Sabha Members Bioprofile - Parliament of India website

1928 births
2016 deaths
Bharatiya Janata Party politicians from Madhya Pradesh
People from Ratlam
People from Jaora
People from Mandsaur district
India MPs 1971–1977
India MPs 1977–1979
India MPs 1989–1991
India MPs 1991–1996
India MPs 1996–1997
India MPs 1998–1999
India MPs 1999–2004
India MPs 2004–2009
Lok Sabha members from Madhya Pradesh
Bharatiya Jana Sangh politicians